Still Ignorant is a live album by American thrash metal band Sacred Reich. It was released in November 1997 via Metal Blade Records and follows the band's fourth studio album, Heal, the previous year. 

The album sees the return of original drummer, Greg Hall, after an absence of six years; Dave McClain had left to join Machine Head. This was their last recording before their split in 2000 and reunion in 2006.

Track listing
All tracks written by Phil Rind, unless stated otherwise.
"American Way" (Wiley Arnett, Rind) – 3:48
"Administrative Decisions" – 3:40 
"One Nation" (Arnett, Rind) – 2:55
"Independent" – 3:51 
"State of Emergency" – 5:35 
"The Power of the Written Word" (Arnett, Rind) – 2:51 
"Heal" – 3:48
"Blue Suit, Brown Shirt" – 2:37 
"Who's to Blame?" – 3:44
"Violent Solutions" (Jason Rainey, Rind) – 4:36 
"War Pigs" (Black Sabbath cover) – 7:03 
"Death Squad" – 4:30
"Surf Nicaragua" – 4:49

Credits
 Phil Rind – vocals, bass
 Wiley Arnett – lead guitar
 Jason Rainey – rhythm guitar
 Greg Hall – drums
 Recorded by Aaron Carey at The Mason Jar, Phoenix, Arizona, U.S.
 Produced and mixed by Bill Metoyer and Sacred Reich
 Mixed at Vintage Recorders, Phoenix, Arizona, U.S.
 Cover art by Paul Stottler

References

External links
Sacred Reich Official Website
BNR Metal discography page
Metal Blade Records album page
Encyclopaedia Metallum album page

1997 live albums
Sacred Reich albums
Metal Blade Records live albums
Live thrash metal albums